The 1979 Avon Championships of Boston  was a women's tennis tournament played on indoor carpet courts at the Boston University Walter Brown Arena  in Boston, Massachusetts in the United States that was part of the 1979 Avon Championships circuit. It was the sixth edition of the tournament and was held from March 12 through March 18, 1979. Second-seeded Dianne Fromholtz won the singles title and earned $30,000 first-prize money.

Finals

Singles
 Dianne Fromholtz defeated  Sue Barker 6–2, 7–6(7–4)

Doubles
 Kerry Reid /  Wendy Turnbull defeated  Sue Barker /  Ann Kiyomura 6–4, 6–2

Prize money

References

External links
 Women's Tennis Association (WTA) tournament edition details
 International Tennis Federation (ITF) tournament edition details

Avon Championships of Boston
Virginia Slims of Boston
1979 in sports in Massachusetts
1979 in American tennis